Cleome spinosa, called the spiny spiderflower, is a species of flowering plant in the genus Cleome. It is native to the New World Tropics, and has been has been introduced to the United States, tropical Africa, the Indian Subcontinent, Vietnam, New Caledonia, and Korea. It is pollinated by bats.

References

spinosa
Plants described in 1760